St. Joseph Chapel, Americankettu North West, is in Cheloor, a village in Irinjalakuda, Trichur, Kerala, India, on the coast of the Arabian Sea. The nearest beach is Kakkathuruthi. It has one of the magnificent churches of the Kerala Syro Malabar Catholic community. St. Joseph Chapel, Americankettu North West, is under the governance of Cheloor St. Mary's Church.

Built in 2009–10 and consecrated on 1 May 2010 on the feast of May Day, a special day for the patron of workers, St. Joseph, this chapel was named after him. Mr. A. O. Jacob of Achangadon built this chapel out of his own money and handed it over to St. Mary's Church.

Daily rosary prayers are offered by the neighbours here in the evening. Built in a modern architectural style it attracts many visitors.

References

External links 
 Cheloor Church website

Eastern Catholic churches in Kerala
Churches completed in 2010
Churches in Thrissur district
Syro-Malabar Catholic church buildings
Chapels in India